Sir Jeremy Ian Fleming  is the Director of the Government Communications Headquarters, the UK's intelligence, cyber and security agency. He was appointed in 2017 and is the 16th person to hold the role.

Career

MI5 
Fleming joined MI5 in 1993. He gained extensive operational, investigative and leadership experience across the full range of national security work. He helped shape MI5's response to the London terrorist attacks in 2005, led the revision and publication of the Government's counter-terrorism strategy, CONTEST and was promoted to Assistant Director General to lead MI5's preparations for the London 2012 Olympics. He then spent four years as Deputy Director General with responsibility for all investigations and operations.

He was appointed Companion of the Order of the Bath in the 2017 New Year Honours.

GCHQ 
In GCHQ, Fleming has overseen the creation of the National Cyber Security Centre with a mission to make the UK the safest place to live and do business online. It has become a world leader in bringing together Government, industry and international partners to address cyber threats and inform the public. Fleming has overseen a significant period of growth in the Agency, with the development of a strategic base in Manchester and a focus on diversity and inclusion. In 2019 he led GCHQ's centenary celebrations with the publication of a landmark official history. And in 2020, a new partnership with the Ministry of Defence was announced to create a National Cyber Force charged with delivering cyber operations.

He was appointed Knight Commander of the Order of St Michael and St George (KCMG) in the 2021 Birthday Honours for services to national security.

Notable speeches and Interviews

Cyber 
In October 2018, Fleming described how the UK must continue to think strategically about its national response to the new generation of technology. As part of the International Institute for Strategic Studies Fullerton Lecture Series in February 2019, he described the concept of cyber power - what that requires of a country, and the rules, regulations and ethics needed to exercise such power responsibly. Fleming built on this the following month when speaking to 29 member states at the NATO Cyber Defence Pledge conference, talking of the need to work together to tackle common threats and to be prepared for cyber attacks against their countries. He stressed that a framework was needed that promotes the responsible projection of a nation's cyber capabilities. In June 2019, he touched on the role of GCHQ and the NCSC in protecting the Digital Homeland of the UK and in particular the work the organisations have done to keep businesses safe online He also encouraged businesses to work with government and academia to help create a more cyber literate population and to invest in the cyber and digital skills for the next generation.

Technology 
In his first public speech at CyberUK in April 2018, Fleming warned that the UK's adversaries were proactively using technology to further their cause and that the threats they face were changing constantly and becoming more complex. Later that year at the Billington Cyber Security Summit he stressed the need to build secure technology in order to keep citizens, economies and societies safe.

In April 2021 Fleming discussed the impact fundamental changes in the tech environment have had on the UK's economy and society, and the way in which the COVID-19 pandemic accelerated those trends at home but also enabled their adversaries in new ways. He also examined the challenges surrounding geopolitical competition in technology, and the need to reform the international approach to cyber and technology for the 21st century.

China
In October 2022, Fleming warned in an interview of China's use of technology to attack satellite systems, to control digital currencies and to control dissent by tracking individuals. He also expressed concern over China's clientelist development strategies, the potential loss of the West's leadership in certain critical technologies, and its dependencies on Chinese state-linked enterprises.

War in Ukraine 

On a visit to the Australian National University on 31 March 2022, Fleming talked about Russia’s invasion of Ukraine. He paid tribute to Ukrainian cyber security personnel, and pledged continued support.

Radio 4 Today Programme

In December 2022 Fleming was the Guest Editor on an edition of the Today Programme on BBC Radio 4.

References 

Directors of the Government Communications Headquarters
Year of birth missing (living people)
Living people
MI5 personnel
Knights Commander of the Order of St Michael and St George
Companions of the Order of the Bath